Ngawi (pronounced "ngaa-wee") is a small fishing / holiday village within five kilometres of Cape Palliser, the southern-most point of New Zealand's North Island.  

The New Zealand Ministry for Culture and Heritage gives a translation of Ngāwī as "the native tussock grass".

The area is popular with commercial and recreational fishermen. The fishery includes paua (a type of abalone which is prized for its iridescent shell as well as the flesh), crayfish, and cod.

Ngawi has more bulldozers per capita than anywhere else. The bulldozers are used to haul fishing boats into and out of the water as there is no wharf or other access to the ocean other than the beach, which can be notoriously rough. Crayfish (also known as rock lobster) are caught commercially for live export. In 2011, there were around a dozen commercial fishermen working from Ngawi, but most did not live in the village.

The village comprises mainly small wooden houses, called baches. The population is much larger during the summer season, when all the holiday homes are occupied.

Ngawi is known for its exposed climate, its intense and prolonged wind and the fact that there are almost no trees nearby. The weather can be extremely hot in summer. 

Several ships have been wrecked on the rough coastline.

In May 2006, filmmaker Peter Salmon shot a short film called 'Fog' in Ngawi. Salmon was drawn to the area's unique landscape and isolated feel. 'Fog' premiered at Critic's Week at the Cannes Film Festival in 2007. It stars Joe Dekkers-Reihana, Chelsie Crayford Preston, Jim Moriarty and Tina Cook.

References

South Wairarapa District
Populated places in the Wellington Region